Greenfield is the name of some places in the U.S. state of Wisconsin:

Greenfield, Wisconsin, a city in Milwaukee County
Greenfield, La Crosse County, Wisconsin, a town
Greenfield, Monroe County, Wisconsin, a town
Greenfield, Sauk County, Wisconsin, a town